Relax Freddie is a 1966 Danish comedy film directed by Erik Balling and starring Morten Grunwald. It is a sequel to Strike first Freddy.

Cast
 Morten Grunwald as Frede Hansen
 Ove Sprogøe as Agent Smith
 Erik Mørk as Presto
 Hanne Borchsenius as Diana
 Clara Pontoppidan as Mamma
 Dirch Passer as Fettucino
 Carl Ottosen as Spinoza
 Asbjørn Andersen as Chefen
 Kristopher Kum as Dr. Ling Fu
 Freddy Koch as Embedsmanden
 Poul Thomsen as Gonzarles
 Gunnar Strømvad as Enrico
 André Sallyman as Luigi
 Bjørn Spiro as Leonardo
 Bent Thalmay as Benjamino
 Preben Mahrt as Portieren
 John Wittig as Agent I

References

External links

1966 films
1966 comedy films
1960s Danish-language films
Films directed by Erik Balling
Films with screenplays by Erik Balling
Danish sequel films
Danish comedy films